Syntroleum Corporation was a United States company engaged in development and commercialization of proprietary gas to liquids (GTL) and coal to liquids (CTL) processes known jointly as the Syntroleum Process. Renewable Energy Group acquired the company on June 3, 2014.

History
Syntroleum was incorporated in 1984 by Kenneth Agee. It became a publicly held company on Nasdaq in August, 1998, when it merged with publicly traded SLH Corporation.
On March 16, 2004, the company was reported shipping the first load of diesel from its gas-to-liquids demonstration plant at the Port of Catoosa near Tulsa to the Massachusetts Institute of Technology. On July 15, 2010 it was reported that Energy Opportunity Ltd. out of the British Virgin Islands made the commitment to purchase $10 million in Syntroleum stock. The commitment was to purchase stock in Syntroleum over a 24 month period. Energy Opportunity was limited to a purchase no more than 4.9% of Syntroleum stock ownership.

It was announced in December 2013 that Syntroleum's operations would be sold to Renewable Energy Group Inc. of Ames, Iowa.

Technology
The Syntroleum process produces synthetic fuel by the Fischer–Tropsch process, which can use natural gas, coal, or biomass as feedstocks. One of the unique features of the Syntroleum process is that it uses air instead of oxygen to produce synthesis gas from natural gas in the gas to liquids process.

Operations
Syntroleum has been working with the U. S. Air Force to develop a synthetic jet fuel blend. The Air Force, which is the U.S. military's largest user of fuel, began exploring alternative fuel sources in 1999. On December 15, 2006, a B-52 took off from Edwards AFB for the first time powered solely by a 50–50 blend of JP-8 and Syntroleum's FT fuel. The seven-hour flight test was considered a success. The goal of the flight test program was to qualify the fuel blend for fleet use on the service's B-52s, and then flight test and qualification on other aircraft.

Syntroleum has opened the $150 million Dynamic Fuels facility in Geismar, Louisiana. The facility operates as a joint venture with Tyson Foods. They produce synthetic fuel by utilizing Syntroleum's technology and Tyson sourced agricultural feedstock.

References

External links
 Renewable Energy Group Company Website
  Wright Patterson Air Force Base Tests Syntroleum R-8 Blend
 

Companies based in Tulsa, Oklahoma
Defunct oil companies of the United States
Companies formerly listed on the Nasdaq